Veeramani Daasan is an Indian singer of devotional songs and cinema songs.

Earlier Veeramani Daasan had a light music troupe, Sruti Laya. But now it is devotional singing most of the way. He has sung for a couple of films too. Beginning with Ramanuja Suprabhatham, Veeramani Daasan has come out with many albums including the recent "Amman Kovil". Having sung more than 3,500 songs this singer who travels extensively for concerts is at home in Kannada and Telugu devotionals too. He shot to fame with the popular devotional song "Yellam Valla Thaye". He is no way connected with Veeramani family!

Albums

References

External links
 http://www.raaga.com/channels/tamil/artist/Veeramanidasan.html
 https://www.facebook.com/Dharanimovie 
 http://tamiltunes.com/dharani-2014.html
 https://www.youtube.com/watch?v=W5_Q-Lz1Bhc

Indian male singers
Bhajan singers
Performers of Hindu music
Living people
Year of birth missing (living people)